Norman Edward "Norm, Dodger" Collings (May 6, 1910 – October 6, 1975) was a Canadian professional ice hockey left winger who played in one National Hockey League game for the Montreal Canadiens during the 1934–35 NHL season. He is buried in Mount Pleasant Cemetery in Bradford Ontario Canada.

See also
List of players who played only one game in the NHL

External links

1910 births
1975 deaths
Canadian ice hockey left wingers
Ice hockey people from Simcoe County
Montreal Canadiens players
New Haven Eagles players
Philadelphia Arrows players
Tulsa Oilers (AHA) players
Canadian expatriate ice hockey players in the United States